Otis Turner (November 29, 1862 – March 28, 1918) was an American director, screenwriter and producer. Between 1908 and 1917, he directed more than 130 films and wrote 40 scenarios. He was born in Fairfield, Indiana, and died in Los Angeles.

The producer/director Otis Werner in L. Frank Baum's Aunt Jane's Nieces Out West is a send-up of Turner, who had adapted Baum's works into films, first in collaboration with Baum, then legally but without Baum's approval.

Selected filmography 

 The Fairylogue and Radio-Plays (1908)
 Dr. Jekyll and Mr. Hyde (1908)
 The Cowboy Millionaire (1909)
 The Wonderful Wizard of Oz (1910)
 Shon the Piper (1913)
 Called Back (1914)
 The Spy (1914)
Damon and Pythias (1914)
 The Opened Shutters (1914)
 The Black Box (1915)
 From Italy's Shores (1915)
 Langdon's Legacy (1916)
 The Island of Desire (1917)
 Melting Millions (1917)
 The Book Agent (1917)
 The Soul of Satan (1917)
 Some Boy! (1917)

References

External links 

 

1862 births
1918 deaths
American male screenwriters
People from Howard County, Indiana
Film directors from Indiana
Screenwriters from Indiana
Film producers from Indiana
20th-century American male writers
20th-century American screenwriters
19th-century American businesspeople